Ax 3 Domaines is a winter sports resort situated in the commune of Ax-les-Thermes, departement of Ariège, in France. Since 2001, the climb to the ski station has been used as a stage finish in the Tour de France cycle race.

Tour de France stage finishes

References

Geography of Ariège (department)
Ski stations in France
Sports venues in Ariège (department)